Wīwī is a common name for several species of New Zealand rushes and sedges whose individual plants grow as a clump with wire-like stems. The name wīwī has been adopted in English from the Māori language.

Ficinia nodosa, knobby club-rush, a sedge native to New Zealand, Australia and South Africa
Juncus australis, austral rush, native to New Zealand and Australia
Juncus edgariae, Edgar's rush, endemic to New Zealand
Juncus kraussii, sea rush, native to New Zealand, Australia, South America and southern Africa
Juncus pallidus, giant rush, native to New Zealand and Australia
Juncus sarophorus, broom rush, native to New Zealand and Australia

The name wīwī is sometimes used for a tussock grass with narrow wire-like leaves, though wī is more usual for this. 
Poa cita, silver tussock, a tussock grass endemic to New Zealand

Flora of New Zealand